The following is a list of Sites of Special Scientific Interest in the Mid and East Lothian Area of Search, in Scotland. For other areas, see List of SSSIs by Area of Search.

Aberlady Bay LNR 
Auchencorth Moss
 Bangley Quarry
 Barns Ness Coast
 Bass Rock
 Bilston Burn
 Black Burn
 Crichton Glen
 Dalkeith Oakwood
 Danskine Loch
 Dundreich Plateau
 Fala Flow
 Firth of Forth
 Forth Islands
 Garleton hills
 Gladhouse Reservoir
 Habbies Howe - Logan Burn
 Hadfast Valley
 Hewan Bank
 Keith Water
 Lammer Law
 Lammermuir Deans
 Levenhall Links
 Moorfoot Hills
 Newhall Glen
 North Berwick Law
 North Esk Valley
 Papana Water
 Peeswit Moss
 Rammer Cleugh
 Roslin Glen
 Traprain Law
 Woodhall Dean

 
Mid and East Lothian